Imran Jafferally (born 23 July 1980) is a former Guyanese cricketer who played first-class cricket for Guyana between the 2004/05 and 2006/07 seasons.  He was born at Skeldon, East Berbice-Corentyne.

References

External links
Imran Jafferally at ESPNcricinfo

1980 births
Living people
Guyanese cricketers
Guyana cricketers
People from East Berbice-Corentyne